Kerstin Thompson is an Australian architect, born in Melbourne in 1965. She is the principal of Kerstin Thompson Architects (KTA), a Melbourne-based architecture, landscape and urban design practice with projects in Australia and New Zealand. She is also Professor of Design at the School of Architecture at Victoria University of Wellington, New Zealand, and Adjunct Professor at RMIT University and Monash University.

Career 

Thompson earned her bachelor's degree in architecture at RMIT in 1989. During her undergraduate studies she worked in the Milan-based studio of Matteo Thun (1987) and the Melbourne-based practice of Robinson Chen (1988–89). From 1990 to 1994 she was a lecturer in architectural design at RMIT and she completed her Master's in Architecture there in 1998.

Since 1994 she has run her own architectural firm, Kerstin Thompson Architects (KTA). She has won a number of awards for her houses. In 2012 Big Hill won the Houses Award for New House over 200m2 and in 2014 House at Hanging Rock won the Robin Boyd Award for Residential Architecture – Houses (New); she is one of the first women to win this award.

Thompson was a member of the Federal Government's BEIIC Advisory Committee. She was the Creative Director for the 2005 RAIA National Conference and one of the Creative Directors for Australia's 2008 Venice Biennale exhibition, Abundant Australia.

She is a panel member of the Victorian Design Review Panel (VDRP) with the Office of the Victorian Government Architect.

Notable projects 
House at Lake Connewarre, Leopold, Australia, 1999–2003
Napier Street Housing, Fitzroy, Australia, 2001
Upside-Down House, Melbourne, Australia, 2005
Visitors Centre at Royal Botanic Gardens, Cranbourne, Australia, 2007
Ivanhoe House, Melbourne, Australia, 2008
Monash University Museum of Art, Melbourne, Australia, 2010
House at Big Hill, Victoria, Australia, 2011
  House at Hanging Rock, Victoria, Australia, 2013

References

External links 

Full list of publications and projects by Kerstin Thompson, Victoria University of Wellington

1965 births
Living people
Architects from Melbourne
Australian women architects
21st-century Australian architects
20th-century Australian architects
RMIT University alumni
Australian academics
Academic staff of the Victoria University of Wellington
Architecture educators
20th-century Australian women
21st-century Australian women